Poul Henningsen (9 September 1894 – 31 January 1967) was a Danish author, critic, architect, and designer. In Denmark, where he often is referred to simply as PH, he was one of the leading figures of the cultural life of Denmark between the World Wars.

He is most associated with his design of the PH-lamp series of glare-free, shaded lamps. His lamps used carefully analyzed reflecting and baffling of the light rays from the bulb to achieve illumination that was not harsh and glaring but shed warm, soft light. His light fixtures were manufactured by Danish lighting manufacturer Louis Poulsen, a company with which Henningsen would build a lifelong working relationship. His novel works of Danish modern designs are featured in many museums.

Biography

Early life and education

Poul Henningsen was the fourth child of noted author Agnes Henningsen (1868–1962) through an extramarital relationship she had with satirist Carl Ewald (1856-1908) following her first marriage, that had ended in divorce. He and his three half-siblings spent a happy childhood in their mother's tolerant and modern home in Ordrup, that often was visited by the leading literates.

At the age of 16, he invented a self-pumping bicycle that earned him a scholarship from the Hielmstierne-Rosencroneske Foundation.

Between 1911 and 1917, he was trained at Copenhagen Technical College and the Technical University of Denmark, where he studied to be an architect, but never graduated, choosing instead to follow a career as an inventor and painter.

On 10 June 1919, he married his first wife Else Henningsen (née Strøyberg) in Copenhagen.

Early career 
He entered into with the architect Kay Fisker in 1919.
From 1920, Poul Henningsen freelanced as an architect and designer. 

In 1920, Henningsen created the Slotsholm Lamp (Danish: Slotsholmslygte) which was installed between the Højbro and Holmens bridges along the Christiansborg Slotsplads canal in central Copenhagen. The prototype lamp consisted a lantern with a large top plate shade on a thin post. Henningsen designed the lamp to differ from the traditional design of gas light fixtures. In a column of Politiken in October 1921 where he wrote about the lamp, he criticized the habitual thinking and conservatism that he witnessed in the field of street lighting and emphasized that electric lights, like his Slotsholm Lamp, must have completely different and unfamiliar appearance than gas lighting. Only seven Slotsholm Lamps were ever created. The failure of the lamps to gain popularity may be due to the manufacturer, Copenhagen Lighting Service, removing some components of the lamp because they caused the light to glare. This was an issue that Poul Henningsen would later solve and the glare-free design feature would become a signature characteristic of his work.  in 1921, he began his journalistic career when hired by Politiken to cover architecture. His writing emphasized the relationship between societal problems and architecture and the effects of Copenhagen's transformation into an urban metropolis. His journalism often focused on what he perceived to be the short-term thinking of municipal authorities' urban planning.
In 1925, Henningsen presented the Paris Lamp (Danish: Pariserlampen) at the International Exhibition of Modern Decorative and Industrial Arts at Paris. Henningsen won the gold medal for this creation. Lamp consisted of 6 shades and was made of silver. An early model of this lamp sold for £87,500 at auction in 2016.

Creating the three-shade lamp system 
After the Paris exhibit, Louis Poulsen and Henningsen were awarded a contract to provide lighting for the newly constructed Forum building in Copenhagen. The building was planned to house an international car exhibition. Rather than using beam lighting, which would illuminate the cars' roofs and hoods but leave the sides of the vehicles dark, Henningsen iterated on the Paris Lamp design to create a lamp that would channel the light in oblique paths.

 The Forum lamp had three shades, with diameter proportions of the shades following a 4:2:1 ratio. This ratio allowed the upper shade to reflect 50% of the light and the middle shade and bottom shade to reflect 25% each. The lamp Henningsen created for Forum would be the basis for the three-shade system. The design was subsequently developed into a comprehensive system of lamps of different sizes, colors, materials, types (floor lamps, table lamps and chandeliers).

During 1926–27, the Forum lamp design was converted into the rational three-shade system (Danish: 3-skærmssystemet) that could accommodate many different needs. The top, middle, and bottom shades corresponded to the proportions of an approximately 3:2:1 ratio (where the top shade was three-times larger than the bottom shade). (The exception was the largest lamp with 85 cm top shade, which used the 4:2:1 proportions). The first line of lamps were made available in five sizes. The lamps sizes in the system were given rational name scheme: 8/8, 6/6, 5/5, 4/4, and 3/3. The first number in the fraction represents the approximate diameter of the top shade in decimeters. The second number indicates the decimeter used to create the middle and bottom shades using the 3:2:1 ratio. For example: A PH 5/5 lamp has a 50 cm top shade, a 31 cm middle shade (around 2/3 of 50), and a 16.5 cm bottom shade (around 1/3 of 50).

The original models (with matching top and bottom fractions) worked well as ceiling lamps but they weren't suited for low-hanging use, like over a table, where the illumination area was too narrow and intense. To address this, Louis Poulsen released lamps in 1927 with larger top shade proportions. These wider lamps, like the PH 4/3 and PH 6/3, had a top shade from a larger model and a middle and bottom shade set from a smaller model. For example, a PH 4/3 lamp has a 40 cm top shade but a middle shade (20 cm) and a bottom shade (11.2 cm) created using the 3:2:1 proportions of a 30 cm top shade.

The lamps were commercially successful and the royalties created the financial safety net for Henningsen to focus on his literary work.

Literary career
During the 1920s Poul Henningsen had his literary breakthrough. He edited the polemic left-wing periodical, Kritisk Revy (1926–1928, "Critical Review"), in which he and his colleagues scorned old-fashioned style and cultural conservatism, linking these themes to politics. At the same time he began as a revue writer praising natural behaviour, sexual broad-mindedness, and simple living. He made the Danish revues a political weapon of the left-wing without giving up its character of entertainment (the so-called PH-revues 1929–32).

Henningsen created the PH Grand Piano (Danish: PH Flyglet) in 1930. Poul Henningsen did a groundbreaking design with the PH Grand Piano that is characterised by the transparent glass-lid, the leather rim and the steel legs. The PH Grand Piano departures significantly from the traditional grand piano or the "black box". Poul Henningsen wanted to open up the piano and bring out the beauty of the musical parts. It has become a Danish design icon and reflects an important contribution to the Bauhaus design tradition.

In 1933, he edited his most famous work What About Culture? (Danish: Hvad med Kulturen? ), a polemic, audacious, and urgent criticism of Danish cultural life and its snobism and passion of the past in spite of all the efforts of the Modern Break-Through. He tried to make parallels between prudery, moralizing, and fascist leanings. He also accused the Social Democrats of lacking a firm and consequent cultural line. Together with this book, his activities as a whole brought him a reputation as a semi-communist "fellow traveller". During this period, in fact, he stood near the communists without joining them. He took part in the anti-fascist propaganda, always trying to connect culture and politics.

Among his other initiatives of this period was Danmarksfilmen (1935), (English: The Film of Denmark), also known as PH's Danmarksfilm. It is an unpretentious and untraditional film portraying life in contemporary Denmark in a lively and slightly disrespectful way in which the visuals are supported by jazz rhythms. Initially, it was condemned and decried by most critics, but later on it became rehabilitated as one of the classic Danish documentary films. He also wrote some movie manuscripts.

Creating PH's House 

In 1937, Henningsen designed his family house (referred to as PH's Eget Hus in Danish) on Brogårdsvej 72 in the Gentofte suburb of Copenhagen for his family - consisting of first wife Else Henningsen and their two teenage children Berta and Simon. The house, which Henningsen jokingly described as the ugliest house in Gentofte, is features exposed concrete blocks construction that may have been a gesture to distance himself from the wealth of his neighbors.

The plot was purchased from Jens Møller-Jensen larger plot on the condition that they did not obstruct Møller-Jensen's view of Gentofte Lake. To accommodate this request, the entire house was built on a slope and features stairs between nearly every room in the house. Henningsen joked that the house combines the disadvantages of a two-story house with the disadvantages of a one-story house.

Henningsen only lived in the house for four years. He moved out of the home after he divorced from his first wife Else Henningsen in 1942. After the divorce, he married physiotherapist Inger Andersen on 31 March 1943.

The building was listed for conservation protection in 1995. In 2014, Realdania By & Byg purchased the house and finished restoring it in 2016.

Fleeing Nazism 
Poul Henningsen was a sharp critic of Nazism. In 1938, he was fired from Politiken for his outspoken views while the newspaper chose to take a neutral position on the impending world war.

On 9 April 1940, German troops invaded and occupied Denmark. During the German Occupation, he kept a low profile but he tried to keep the spirit going by camouflaged resistance poetry. In 1940, Henningsen contributed the song  to Kjeld Abell's revue Dyveke, which called for resistance to the Nazis in a conspicuously fashion that German censors misinterpreted as a song about the restrictive bonds of marriage. Before the Nazis could deport him to the concentration camps or otherwise endanger him, he secretly left Denmark along with most Jewish Danes in 1943. He fled to neutral Sweden with the Jewish architect Arne Jacobsen and their wives in a rowboat led by a Jewish civil engineer and student rower named Herbert Marcus.

The drastic move to flee from Denmark likely saved Henningsen's life. The Danish Nazi leader Wilfred Petersen had planned an assassination plot to kill Henningsen and his family by setting their home on fire. Petersen may have been motivated to murder by PH's Dagmar-revyen (1942), where Henningsen mockingly referred to Petersen as "Vilfred Pedrsen" and comparing him to his rival Frits Clausen in the song And two hearts beat sweetly at the same time (Danish: Så slår to hjerter sødt i samme takt).

Post-war activities 
Henningsen returned to Denmark in 1945. After the war, he dissociated himself from the communists, who were criticizing him for humanitarianism in his attitude toward the settlement with the Nazis and for his growing skepticism about the Soviet Union, and in many ways, he was isolated. He kept writing and debating, however, and during the 1960s in many ways, the new generation made him something of a guru.

In 1946, he re-designed the Glass Hall (Danish: Glassalen) for Tivoli in Copenhagen.

In 1948, Henningsen jointly published a collection of children's songs with Bernhard Christensen. One of these songs was Oh! Monkey or There was once a monkey (Danish: Oh! Abe or Der var engang en abe) which became extremely popular and is one of the most well-known children's songs in Denmark today. In many ways Poul Henningsen is the one who completed the work of Danish critic and scholar Georg Brandes (1842–1927). He was somewhat superficial and light, but more modern and less elitist in his views. Being a tease and a provoker who often tried turning concepts upside down (as George Bernard Shaw also did) and whose conclusions might be both somewhat unjust and exaggerated, he was however, a man of firm principles and ideals of a democratic, natural, and tolerant society.

Poul Henningsen also had a large influence on the Danish company Bang & Olufsen (B&O). In 1954, he wrote a critical review calling a B&O radio "a monster with a bloated belly, an insult to people who like modern furniture." This review was the beginning of a change in product development at B&O where designers would be included in product design.

In 1958, he created his best-known models: PH Artichoke and PH5.

In 1960, Henningsen was again employed by Politiken and the international art industry magazine Mobilia.

He became a member of the Danish Academy in 1963.

Death and legacy 
In 1963, Henningsen was diagnosed with Parkinson's disease and struggled with difficulty speaking, tremors and depression. He began to be viewed as a "Rasmus Modsat" (Danish equivalent to a Mary Quite Contrary) within Danish culture and struggled to get published in Danish newspapers in the last years of his life.

Henningsen died on 31 January 1967. He was buried in Bispebjerg Cemetery in a common grave.
In the time since his death, his contrarian cultural critiques began to have had their breakthrough and his views had become popular and met with acceptance and recognition in much larger circles. The PH Prize was established in memory of Poul Henningsen. The prize is awarded to people or institutions that have promoted ideas for which PH fought. There have been efforts underway to create a permanent space to exhibit Henningsen's work. In 2000, a group started making plans to create a permanent exhibition space for 300 of Poul Henningsen's lamps and a cabaret theater in Kødbyen in Copenhagen. A scaled down cafe and music venue eventually open under the name PH Café (Danish: PH Caféen) but has since closed. In 2010, plans were drafted to create a museum in Vejen dedicated to Poul Henningsen work and to showcase the Louis Poulsen's archive of PH's lamps (valued at DKK 30 million) but the project has not materialized in the intervening time.

PH lamps continue to remain popular, especially in Denmark. The PH lamp shade system was selected into the Danish Culture Canon, where jury committee called it "the symbol of Danishness and good taste" and responsible for Denmark's position "at the forefront of lighting for many years."

Two songs that Henningsen wrote are also included Danish Culture Canon under the 12 Selected Songs by Kai Normann Andersen entry:  and  The songs were also added to the Højskolesangbogen. In 2004, the hip-hop group Outlandish covered Man binder os på mund og hånd. While Henningsen wrote the song to critique the Nazi oppression, the song takes on a contemporary relevance when interpreted with the band's outspoken activism against the Danish government restrictive immigration policies.

In 2018, Danish designers Joakim Zacho Weylandt and Søren Peter Kristensen recreated Henningsen's Slotsholm Lamp using modern means and are seeking support to have they installed along the Christiansborg Slotsplads canal, where the original street lamps once stood.

For the 125 year anniversary of PH's birth, Tivoli opened the "Poul Henningsen in Tivoli" exhibition in 2019 to showcase Henningsen's lamps and his creations in the role head architect at Tivoli.

Poul Henningsens Plads in Copenhagen is named in his honour.

Notable works

Architecture

 Gyldenholm Allé 18, Gentofte, Copenhagen (193334)
  in Henne Strand, Varde Municipality, Denmark (1936)
 in Søborg, Denmark (1936)
Brogårdsvej 72 "PH's House" in Gentofte, Denmark (1937)
Glass Hall (Danish: Glassalen), Tivoli, Copenhagen, Denmark (1956)

Written and visual works 
Songs
  (1929), lyricist, sung by Osvald Helmuth
 (1940), lyricist, sung by Liva Weel
 (1941), lyricist, sung by Liva Weel
 For din skyld (1965), lyricist

Screenplays
Danmarksfilmen (1935), director and writer
 Den opvakte jomfru (1950), writer

Other
 Hva 'mæ kulturen? [What About Culture?] (1933)
 A History of Eroticism (1938) with Ove Brusendorff*
 Love's picture book: The History of Pleasure and Moral Indignation (1958) with Ove Brusendorff*

*Translated to English

Furniture, lamps and product design

Design gallery

See also 

 Danish Modern
 Danish design
 Cultural radicalism

Further reading 

English Language biographies
Jørstian, Tina., Nielsen, Poul Erik Munk (2000). Light years ahead : the story of the PH lamp. (2nd ed.). Copenhagen: Louis Poulsen. . OCLC 51999622.
Danish Language biographies
Paul Hammerich (1986) Lysmageren. En krønike om Poul Henningsen (in Danish). Copenhagen: Aschehoug. 
Hertel, Hans (2019). PH - en biografi (in Danish). Gyldendal A/S. .
Jørstian, Tina, Munk Nielsen, Poul Erik (2007). Tænd! : PH lampens historie (in Danish). Copenhagen: Gyldendal. 2007. Film and video
Roos, Ole (1964), PH lys [PH: Light] (in Danish). Poul Henningsen. Viewable on Louis Poulsen's Youtube page with English subtitles

Design catalogues
 "PHlampen : Katalog B 1931-1932" (in Danish) from the Royal Library of Denmark's Digital collections
 "Louis Poulsen & Co.: Manufacturers of modern Lighting - Price list 1936" (in Danish) from the Royal Library of Denmark's Digital collections
 PH Furniture & Pianos - The Revival of Poul Henningsen Design Classics from March 2020

Analysis and critique
 Lamps, Light, and Enlightenment: Poul Henningsen's Denmark and Ole Roos' PH Light in the Danish film journal Kosmorama

References

External links

Poul Henningsen profile on Louis Poulsen's website
 
Poul Henningsen on the Danish Film Institute
Poul Henningsen architectural drawings at the Danish National Art Library
Poul Henningsen lamps at Danish Furniture
Website for PH Pianos
Information and pictures about the designer Poul Henningsen at the design agency TAGWERC
Bo Bedre magazine's profile on Poul Henningsen (in Danish)

 
Danish industrial designers
Danish modern
Danish furniture designers
Danish architects
Danish male writers
Designers from Copenhagen
Writers from Copenhagen
People from Gentofte Municipality
1894 births
1967 deaths
Burials at East Bispebjerg Cemetery